The Canadian Métis Council was established in 1997 to further the economic, political, spiritual and cultural aspirations of Canada's Métis people. The Canadian Métis Council comprises over 50 community councils and affiliate Métis organizations in every province of Canada. Governed by a Board of Directors, the Canadian Métis Council is a non-profit corporation concerned with cultural issues, harvesting rights, education, health, youth, justice and other related issues that directly effect the Métis people of North America.

References

Métis organizations
Indigenous rights organizations in Canada
Métis in Canada